NJHS may refer to:

 National Junior Honor Society
 New Jersey Historical Society
 New Jewish High School, now known as the Gann Academy